Leon Lloyd Haslam (born 31 May 1983, in the London Borough of Ealing) is a motorcycle road racer based in Derbyshire, England. 

In February 2022, Haslam confirmed he would be racing in British Superbikes for Lee Hardy Racing on a Kawasaki ZX-10RR, whilst the actual sponsor name of the team, VisionTrack (previously a backer of Paul Bird Motorsport), determined later. Haslam competed in a wild card ride at Assen World Superbikes in April 2022, substituting at short notice for Pedercini Racing.

After the 2019 World Superbike season with the factory Kawasaki team, for 2020 and 2021 he was contracted to ride the then-new Honda CBR1000RR-R in the World Superbike Championship, with the team being run for the first time under full HRC control.

Between the 2016 and 2018 seasons, he was contracted to race in the British Superbike Championship aboard a Kawasaki ZX-10R. He won the 2018 British championship at the final event held at Brands Hatch in late October, having previously signed to join the Kawasaki Superbike factory team in World Championship from 2019 as team-mate to Jonathan Rea.

He began racing at an early age and by the time he was in his late teens, he had raced in most of the significant British and international championships. After the 2004 season on a Ducati in World Superbikes with teammate Noriyuki Haga, between 2005 and 2008 he was a regular front-runner in the British Superbike Championship. For 2009 he returned to the Superbike World Championship, riding for Suzuki, BMW, Honda and Aprilia. Haslam is nicknamed 'Pocket Rocket' and is the son of former road-racer 'Rocket Ron' Haslam.

Career

Early career
Haslam was first exposed to motorcycle racing as a baby, often travelling with his parents to his dad, Ron Haslam's, races. He was 1995 and 1996's National Youth Motocross champion, and 1998's MCN Young Rider of the Year after finishing 7th in the British 125cc Championship. He did an assortment of 125cc races in 1999, but quickly advanced into international racing after that.  Leon spent the 2000 season with the underprepared Italjet team on their return to the 125cc world championship, then racing a privateer Honda NSR500V in 2001 (scoring five points finishes, as the youngest rider ever to compete in the series), and a 250cc Honda in 2002 (again scoring points five times).
At this stage, having never ridden on competitive machinery, he had valuable experience but little in the way of results, leading him to return home. For 2003 Renegade Ducati signed him to ride in the British Supersport championship, but he was promoted to the full blown Superbike after the departure of Sean Emmett, also riding in six World Superbikes races with a best finish of sixth at Assen and Magny Cours.

Superbike World Championship
For 2004 he did the full WSBK season for Renegade alongside Noriyuki Haga. He was 8th overall with a best of 3rd, finishing as the rookie of the year.  Haslam also had an impressive victory in a British Superbike race at Brands Hatch on one of the team's 3 ventures into the series. In torrential rain, this was the only Ducati win in the series all year, even though this was the title-winning bike in both 2003 (Shane "Shakey" Byrne) and 2005 (Gregorio Lavilla).

British Superbike Championship

With Renegade switching to Honda machinery and cutting to one rider Haslam moved to BSB with the reformed GSE Racing Squad, now known as Airwaves Ducati.  Haslam finished 4th overall behind only teammate Lavilla and the two HM Plant Hondas of Ryuichi Kiyonari and Michael Rutter.

2006 saw Leon once again on the Airwaves sponsored GSE Ducati 999, partnering Lavilla. In the first 12 races of the 2006 season he finished 2nd no less than 8 times, without winning a race but taking 3 poles and lying 2nd overall. The wins came later; he was particularly proud of a win in the wet at Croft.

He managed to push for the title all the way to the last race of the season at a rain soaked Brands Hatch where Leon, Lavilla and Kiyonari all had a chance to win. Leon was running second to Kiyo in the first race when it was stopped after Byrne crashed heavily, and despite storming to victory in the second race, he ended the season in second place and Lavilla (who crashed in race one) was third. Leon did however drive off in the £50,000 Audi convertible which was his prize for scoring the most points in the Audi pole position competition.

While Lavilla won the first four races and lead the championship after eight, Haslam struggled to match these results. However, two-second places at Oulton Park in round four moved him up to fourth overall. He ultimately finished 3rd, behind Kiyonari and Jonathan Rea's Hondas but ahead of a fading Lavilla.

Haslam was released by Airwaves Ducati for 2008, when they initially withdrew from the series over questions about the legality of the Ducati 1098 under the new BSB tuning rules. He joined Airwaves' rivals HM Plant Honda, but the Ducati proved to be the faster bike, with Shakey Byrne dominating the championship. Haslam struggled early in the season and was generally outpaced by younger teammate Cal Crutchlow, and was excluded from race 2 at Oulton Park after a racing incident with Tom Sykes. Despite several podium finishes his first win did not come until round 8 at Knockhill, when race leader Byrne crashed heavily. He then took a double win at Cadwell Park, despite not starting on the front row

Haslam also made two wild card appearance in the World Superbike Championship at Donington Park and Portimão. A competitive showing at Donington ended with disappointing results. In race one he ran with the leaders after a red flag, but eased off after seeing a white flag with a red cross, which means the surface is slippery in WSBK, while in British Superbike, that indicates a safety vehicle is on course (typically a full-course caution period to neutralise the race with the deployment of the safety car).  The time he lost here proved costly, as he was taken out a lap later. In race two he crashed out of fourth place with just three laps to go. At Portimão he finished third in race two, with a German flag above him on the podium, implying that the officials expected Max Neukirchner to overhaul him.

Return to Superbike
WSBK remained his target for 2009, and he joined the Stiggy Honda team for their first World Superbike campaign, starting the year strongly with a third-place finish at the first round at Phillip Island in race two. The Dutch Grand Prix at Assen was also a very successful weekend as Haslam finished on the podium in both races with a third place in race one and a second place in race two. He finished the season 6th overall, comfortably the top privateer.

Haslam's results for Stiggy led to Alstare Suzuki signing him to partner Sylvain Guintoli for the 2010 season. He took his first WSBK pole in the 2010 season opener at Phillip Island. He then went on to win his first World Superbike race in race one, narrowly beating Michel Fabrizio by 0.004 seconds at the line in the closest finish ever recorded in a World Superbike race. Haslam was also in control of race two until 3 turns from the end he was overtaken by the eventual winner Carlos Checa. He took two-second places at round 2 in Portugal. These strong results continued in the early part of the season, before a run of four successive wins for Max Biaggi's Aprilia. This led Haslam to publicly ask Suzuki Japan for more resources, to prevent their title challenge from faltering. Haslam beat Biaggi in both Silverstone races, to trim Biaggi's championship lead to 60 points. The championship went down to the penultimate round at Imola 
with Haslam needing to win, in race one both Haslam and Biaggi made mistakes, Biaggi ran straight on at turns 3 and 4 the Villeneuve esses cutting across the track right in front of the competitors and was lucky not to be hit or fall off, he recovered to finish 11th while Haslam was 2nd going into the final lap, coming into rivazza one Haslam tried to go underneath race leader Carlos Checa, Haslam however could not stop the bike and ended up in the gravel and could only manage a 5th place, in race 2 Biaggi made a much better start and was right at the front from the start, with Haslam. Haslam made a mistake on lap 7 which dropped him back to 5th place, trying to make his way back up the field going through the Villeneuve esses his engine blew up, this was the Suzuki's first mechanical failure of the year. This handed the title to Max Biaggi who came home 5th, with wild celebrations on the slow down lap.

On 27 September Haslam was released from his two-year contract with Alstare Suzuki by mutual consent, team manager Francis Batta citing the lack of response to the call for help from the Suzuki factory.

On 28 September 2010, Haslam signed a two-year contract with the BMW team to ride in the 2011 Superbike World Championship season, and for the 2013 season he joined Ten Kate Honda Fireblade WSB operating as Team Pata Honda, with Ulsterman Jonny Rea as teammate.

In July 2013 Haslam won the prestigious Coke Zero Suzuka 8 Hours endurance race in Japan, partnered-up for the race with Team Pata World Supersport rider Michael van der Mark – debuting at Suzuka – and 2010 winner Takumi Takahashi in the MuSashi HARC Pro Honda team. The trio repeated victory for the 2014 Coke Zero Suzuka 8 Hours.

After a disappointing 2014 season on the Ten Kate Pata Honda with injuries and average results, Haslam signed to race Aprilia for Red Devils Roma Team in 2015, together with Spanish teammate Jordi Torres.

Personal life
Leon has two sisters, Emma and Zoe. In 2010, he married his long term partner, former glamour model turned TV presenter Olivia Stringer in Sweden, who gave birth to their daughter Ava May in December 2011 and Max Peter on 11 August 2013.

Haslam owns the snooker cue that Peter Ebdon used to win the 2002 World Snooker Championship, and has it framed on his wall. He also enjoys playing poker, pool and golf, and supports Manchester United football club. His training partners included his wife, and the Formula Renault driver Riki Christodoulou. At Mallory Park he also made his debut in the British Rallycross Championship in a Suzuki Swift, for which he then stated he had plans to run in the series part-time in 2010.

Career statistics

Career summary

Grand Prix motorcycle racing

Races by year
(key) (Races in bold indicate pole position) (Races in italics indicate fastest lap)

Superbike World Championship

Races by year
(key) (Races in bold indicate pole position) (Races in italics indicate fastest lap)

* Season still in progress.

British Superbike Championship

Races by year
(key) (Races in bold indicate pole position) (Races in italics indicate fastest lap)

Suzuka 8 Hours Results

References

External links
 Home page on Leon's official site
 Leon Haslam profile up to 2006

Sportspeople from Derbyshire
British motorcycle racers
English motorcycle racers
500cc World Championship riders
Superbike World Championship riders
British Superbike Championship riders
Living people
1983 births